Dean William Glenesk (born September 22, 1957) is an American former modern pentathlete.

Olympics
Glenesk qualified for the 1980 U.S. Olympic team but was unable to compete due to the U.S. Olympic Committee's boycott of the 1980 Summer Olympics in Moscow, Russia. He was one of 461 athletes to receive a Congressional Gold Medal many years later. He did, however, compete in the 1984 Summer Olympics, winning a silver medal in the team event.

References

1957 births
Living people
American male modern pentathletes
Modern pentathletes at the 1984 Summer Olympics
Olympic silver medalists for the United States in modern pentathlon
Medalists at the 1984 Summer Olympics
Congressional Gold Medal recipients
20th-century American people